Malcolm Aguedze Kofi Kpedekpo (born 27 August 1976) is an investment banker and former footballer. Playing for Aberdeen as a schoolboy and later while at university, Kpedekpo left football to move to Australia working for KPMG. He returned to Scotland to work for the Bank of Scotland before starting investment firm Panoramic Growth Equity.

Life and career

Kpedekpo was born in Aberdeen on 27 August 1976. He joined Aberdeen FC aged 16, and he made his first team debut at 18. He made eleven league appearances in total plus one in the UEFA Cup, without scoring. While playing football, Kpedekpo completed of a university degree in management and accounting.

Finding himself frustrated by his lack of first-team football, Kpedekpo was offered the opportunity to go on loan to another club, but instead chose to leave football and followed up an offer given to him by KPMG at a university awards dinner. Moving to Australia on secondment, Kpedekpo stayed there for five years before moving back to his native Scotland to work for the Bank of Scotland.

Kpedekpo started investment firm Panoramic Growth Equity with some colleagues from the Bank of Scotland. The firm secured  from the UK Government's Enterprise Capital Fund, the first Scottish-based company to benefit from that scheme. In June 2010 the firm held a first close of its debut fund at £34 million, the only SME growth fund to close in the United Kingdom in 2010 until then.

Kpedekpo was appointed as a non-executive director of the Scottish Football Association in April 2019.

References

External links
The calling: Malcolm Kpedekpo. Real Deals Europe.
Top Guns. CA Mag Online.

1976 births
Living people
Footballers from Aberdeen
Scottish footballers
Aberdeen F.C. players
Scottish Junior Football Association players
Scottish Football League players
Association football forwards
Black British sportsmen
21st-century Scottish businesspeople
British sportspeople of Ghanaian descent
Scottish people of Ghanaian descent
Alumni of the University of Aberdeen
Harvard Business School alumni
Scottish expatriates in the United States
Scottish expatriates in Australia
Bank of Scotland people
KPMG people
Scottish accountants